

Günther Sachs (4 May 1903 – 15 July 1962) was a general in the Luftwaffe of Nazi Germany during World War II who commanded the 18th Flak Division. He was  a recipient of the Knight's Cross of the Iron Cross.

Awards and decorations 

 German Cross in Gold on 3 January 1944 as Oberst im Generalstab in the I. Luftwaffen-Feld-Korps
 Knight's Cross of the Iron Cross on 24 January 1945 as Generalmajor and commander of  18. Flak-Division

References

Citations

Bibliography 

 

1903 births
1962 deaths
People from the Province of Hanover
Luftwaffe World War II generals
Recipients of the Gold German Cross
Recipients of the Knight's Cross of the Iron Cross
German prisoners of war in World War II
Reichswehr personnel
Lieutenant generals of the Luftwaffe
Military personnel from Lower Saxony
People from Hanover Region